Douglas Kipserem (born 1987) is a Kenyan long-distance runner who competes in the 5000 metres. He was the gold medallist in the event at the 2016 African Championships in Athletics.

He first appeared at the elite level in 2013, ranking in the world top 200, then placed within the top 150 in the 2014 season. A member of the Kenya Defence Forces, he was the 5000 m runner-up at the Kenyan Athletics Championships in 2016, gaining his first national selection.

International competitions

References

External links

Living people
1987 births
Kenyan male long-distance runners